Faye Orlove is an artist and business owner residing in Los Angeles, California. She is known for her unique style of art, as well as for her business called "Junior High." Her business is a nonprofit organization that creates a platform for marginalized youth through the use of different art forms, such as music, digital art, visual art, and more. In her personal life, as well as the art showcased at "Junior High," Orlove's art aims to create varying perspectives on the issues that can present themselves during a girl's youth, as these are formative times in a girl's life.

Personal life 
Born in Silver Spring, Maryland on September 22, 1990, Orlove went to Emerson College and graduated with a degree in post-production. In Boston, Orlove worked at a venue called "Middle East," where she would do whatever jobs were asked of her, but that all changed when she sold out the venue after booking an all-girl band show, realizing that her passion was making female artists into role models.

After her time in Boston, Orlove decided to move to Los Angeles to create a physical space of her own that encourages female empowerment, something Orlove believes is lacking. Through some personal mental health struggles, there were hard times, especially at the start of the business. At the beginning, Orlove struggled with finding confidence in her decision-making skills because of how inexperienced she felt, leading her to go to a therapist and make sense of her new world. In the late 19th and early 20th centuries, Sigmund Freud began to notice how work can impact one's well-being, assisting others in taking notice to this as well. The 21st century has begun a mental health reform, people have begun to recognize the importance of mental stability. It was illustrated how stress can be detrimental to one's health, resulting in consequences such as health complications and psychological complications.

As those beginning stages of doubt declined, Orlove was faced with more challenges, including making money and what kind of representation she wished others to see through her business. "Junior High" collects donations and when women display their artwork, they keep all of the profits, as Orlove does not take a share, especially since she recognizes that women get paid less in the work world. Additionally, Orlove takes into consideration other people's speculations and concerns, as she "appreciate[s] that people are giving [her] flack and questioning [her] intentions and asking whether [her] promoting a black girl is performative or not." Listening to their concerns, Orlove self-reflects on how to be as inclusive as possible, since she created the space to make sure all girls feel comfortable, not just herself.

Career 
After moving to Los Angeles, Orlove launched a Kickstarter campaign in order to help fund her dream of opening up "Junior High" in 2016. To Orlove, it is her top priority to "offer the space to as many intersectional voices and communities as [she] can in an effort to feature a diverse array of experiences." The range in experiences had by women are incomparable to one another, which is the reason that Orlove feels that it is vital to give a safe space to anyone who feels they need it. Marginalization results in the feeling of unimportance and this therefore leads to feeling separated from the majority group. These feelings are held by many groups of minorities because they feel that their voices do not deserve to be heard, and because of this, Orlove decided to make "Junior High" into a place where everyone has an equal voice. This feeling of inferiority that marginalized female youths have impacts them psychologically, as well as physically, because they feel their voices are being suppressed by the masses, a group that experiences life differently than minority groups. The feeling of social inequality stems from feeling disapproval from others, therefore creating a place of approval would consequently help with self-esteem and the feeling of equality.

Inside of "Junior High," Orlove has hosted galleries with works of embroidery, illustrations, photography, self-portraits and more. Each of these works represents different themes relating to the artists' perspectives on life as they experience it, in addition to supporting other girls and activism. It is especially important to Orlove to represent and feature as many types of people she can, including showing equality for girls of any size, background, race, and more. As Orlove has pointed out, making money can be hard to come by since she takes donations. Since long ago, women have held more jobs pertaining to work around the house, widening the pay gap between genders and while it has gotten closer, the gap still exists. Closing the wage gap will only persist if women rise to top positions within their companies because the presence of an upper-level female worker shows to cause the most impact in making the gap more narrow.

In addition to "Junior High," Orlove also does work for herself, such as working with musicians, National Public Radio (NPR), branding, and illustrations. This aforementioned work has given her the opportunity to work with people like Mitski, Caroline Goldfarb, Grace Pickering, Frankie Cosmos, Lisa Prank, Palehound and work for clients like Fox's ADHD and The FADER. Orlove has directed music videos and other freelance projects for herself, as her business is not the only source of her energy.

References

External links 

 http://www.fayeorlove.com/

American artists
1990 births
Living people